Zosia Russell Mamet (born February 2, 1988) is an American actress and musician who has appeared in television series including Mad Men, United States of Tara and Parenthood, and played the character Shoshanna Shapiro on the HBO original series Girls. She currently stars as Annie Mouradian in the HBO Max original series The Flight Attendant.

Early life
Mamet was born in Randolph, Vermont. She is the daughter of American playwright, essayist, screenwriter, and film director David Mamet and actress Lindsay Crouse. Her father is Jewish and her mother is Buddhist, and Mamet identifies as Jewish as well. Her maternal grandfather was playwright Russel Crouse and her maternal great-grandfather was educator John Erskine. She has a sister, Willa, who is a singer, and two half-siblings, Clara, who is also an actress and director, and Noah. She lived in New England until age five when her mother moved to Pacific Palisades, California with Willa and Zosia. After finishing high school, Mamet decided to pursue acting instead of going to college.

Career
In 2012, she was cast by Judd Apatow in the HBO series Girls.

Music
Mamet has a band called Chacha.

Voice acting
Mamet performed the audiobook The Feral Detective by author Jonathan Lethem. Mamet has also done voice-over work in Star vs. The Forces of Evil, Regular Show, and The Simpsons.

Personal life
Mamet began dating actor Evan Jonigkeit in 2013. The two wed in October 2016.

At the 2017 Makers Conference, Mamet performed a monologue where she shared her struggle living with undiagnosed pelvic floor dysfunction for six years.

Filmography

Film

Television

References

External links
ZosiaMamet.com

1988 births
American television actresses
Living people
Jewish American actresses
21st-century American actresses
People from Randolph, Vermont
People from Pacific Palisades, California
Actresses from Vermont
Actresses from Los Angeles
Crossroads School alumni
21st-century American Jews